Robert Frederick MacLeod (October 15, 1917 – January 13, 2003) was an American football halfback He was elected to the College Football Hall of Fame in 1977. He played in nine games for the Chicago Bears in 1939.

MacLeod also played professional basketball for the Chicago Bruins of the National Basketball League.

References

External links
 

1917 births
2003 deaths
American football halfbacks
American men's basketball players
Dartmouth Big Green football players
Dartmouth Big Green men's basketball players
Chicago Bruins players
Chicago Bears players
All-American college football players
College Football Hall of Fame inductees
People from Glen Ellyn, Illinois
Players of American football from Illinois
Basketball players from Illinois